Bonnie J. Fraser Henry  (born ) is a Canadian physician and public servant who has been the provincial health officer at the British Columbia Ministry of Health since 2014. Henry is also a clinical associate professor at the University of British Columbia. She is a specialist in public health and preventive medicine, and is a family doctor. In her role as provincial health officer, Henry notably led the response to COVID-19 in British Columbia (BC).

Early life and education 
Born in Fredericton, New Brunswick, Henry grew up in Charlottetown, Prince Edward Island, where her mother, father, sister, niece, and nephew live. Her father was a major in the Canadian Army; the family lived in many different locations due to his postings, including Calgary, St. John's, and the Netherlands. Henry is the second-oldest of four daughters.

In 1986, Henry received a Bachelor of Science (Honours) from Mount Allison University. In 1990, Henry earned her Doctor of Medicine degree from Dalhousie University Faculty of Medicine. From 1996 to 1999, Henry did a residency in preventive medicine at the University of California, San Diego. In 1999, she earned an Master of Public Health degree in epidemiology from San Diego State University. In 2001, Henry completed a residency in public health and preventive medicine at the University of Toronto in Ontario, Canada.

Career
During her third year of her medical degree at Dalhousie, Henry joined the Royal Canadian Navy and served as a medical officer after graduating. She served for ten years at CFB Esquimalt, located in Victoria, BC on Vancouver Island.

In the early 2000s, Henry served as part of the World Health Organization (WHO) – UNICEF polio eradication programme in Pakistan. She continued to work with the WHO in 2001, moving to Uganda to support their efforts to tackle the Ebola virus disease. Henry helped to establish the Canada Pandemic Influenza Plan, which contains recommendations for health-related activities during the spread of a virus.

In September 2001, Henry joined Toronto Public Health as an associate medical officer of health, where she led the Emergency Services Unit and the Communicable Disease Liaison Unit. In this capacity she was operational lead of the response to the severe acute respiratory syndrome (SARS) and Influenza A virus subtype H1N1 outbreaks in Toronto.

From 2005 to 2007, Henry worked as a physician epidemiologist at the BC Centre for Disease Control. From 2007 to 2014, she was the medical director of Public Health Emergency Management while also working as medical director of Communicable Disease Prevention and Control starting in 2011. She helped Canada to plan and police the 2010 Winter Olympics.

In December 2013, Henry was made interim provincial executive medical director of the BC Centre for Disease Control. She was made Deputy Provincial Health Officer in August 2014, a position she held for three years. She helped to lead British Columbia through a catastrophic wildfire season, which impacted the air quality, as well as advising the Government of Canada on the Influenza A virus subtype H7N9 epidemic. In 2015, she testified as an expert witness alongside Allison McGeer in a labour arbitration between the Ontario Nurses' Association and Sault Area Hospital regarding a "vaccine or mask" policy.

In February 2018, Henry was appointed as the provincial health officer for British Columbia, the first woman to hold the role. She chairs the pandemic influenza task group. The group looks to minimise the number of people who become seriously ill during a pandemic, as well as limiting the social disruptions. She called for more efficient electronic systems to understand vaccine uptake, as well as manage Canada's vaccine inventory.

Henry has taught at the University of British Columbia School of Population and Public Health, and the Faculty of Medicine since 2010, where she is an associate professor. She also received an honorary degree from the University of British Columbia in 2021.

COVID-19 response 

Henry leads the provincial government's response to the COVID-19 pandemic in British Columbia. Her early handling of the COVID-19 pandemic in British Columbia earned praise from the New York Times in June 2020. In August, September, and October 2020, Henry was criticized for not mandating public mask usage and the province's back-to-school plans. In November and December concerns were raised regarding the lack of transparency around COVID-19 data. In December 2021 she was criticized for previous claims that COVID mostly spreads by droplets instead of aerosols.

A book written by Bonnie Henry and Lynn Henry was released in February 2021 called Be Kind, Be Calm, Be Safe. It describes the four early weeks of the COVID-19 pandemic.

First half 2020
On 30 January 2020, following confirmation of the first infected person in British Columbia, Henry advised the public that "It is not necessary for the general public to take special precautions beyond the usual measures recommended to prevent other common respiratory viruses during the winter period." In March, medical columnist for The Globe and Mail described her as "a calming voice in a sea of coronavirus madness". In April, she cautioned against relying on mass testing as a strategy to control the spread of SARS-CoV-2 due to the risk of "up to 30 per cent" of tests potentially resulting in false negatives. In June, Henry was featured in a New York Times article titled "The Top Doctor Who Aced the Coronavirus Test", praising the way that she has handled the COVID-19 pandemic.

Second half 2020
In August, September, and October 2020, Henry was criticized for not mandating public mask usage and BC's back to school plans. This included not allowing the requirement for masks in classrooms in the province, and only permitting the universal requirement for masks in hospitals on November 6, 2020.

A limited edition Compass card featuring the quote from Henry, "Be Kind, Be Calm, Be Safe" was released by TransLink on September 15, 2020. On 22 September 2020, Henry stated that she received death threats and "(has) had to have security in (her) house."

In November 2020 the Public Health Agency of Canada (PHAC) stated that BC was no longer saying what proportion of people who tested positive are healthcare providers. Initially Henry denied that these data were not being provided to the Canadian government, while also saying that she was worried that the federal government would not present it properly. The numbers were subsequently released with 1,442 (8.9%) out of 16,136 cases in BC in healthcare providers. In November, Henry indicated that not all public health data were being shared with the federal government due to concerns with how they were being interpreted at the federal level, and that could lead to incorrect assumptions regarding COVID-19 spread. She did confirm that they were sharing all aggregate data. Further concerns were raised in December regarding the lack of transparency of COVID-19 data in BC.

Henry was named a co-investigator in the Canadian Network of COVID-19 Clinical Trials Networks, a $6 million grant provided by the Canadian Institutes of Health Research to support research and implementation of public health interventions across Canada. The funding period runs from December 1, 2020 until June 30, 2022.

On December 22, Henry received one of the first 3,600 doses of the Pfizer–BioNTech COVID-19 vaccine, saying "It’s really my way of showing how confident we are in the vaccine and how important it is for all of us to be immunized in solidarity with (health-care workers)".

2021
In July 2021, Henry warned that while it was an individual choice to accept or decline a COVID-19 vaccine, "there are consequences for people who are not immunized". In December 2021 she was criticized for prior claims that COVID-19 mostly spreads by droplets instead of aerosols.

Personal life
Henry lives in Victoria, British Columbia. She met her husband while serving in the Royal Canadian Navy. The couple separated after 20 years of marriage. Henry was made a Member of the Order of British Columbia in 2021.

Leadership
 2009: Canadian Pandemic Coordinating Committee responding to pandemic H1N1 influenza, Member
 Canadian Public Health Measures Task Group, Chair
 Canadian National Advisory Committee on Immunization, Member
 Immunize Canada, Chair
 Infection Control Expert Group, Member
 National Infection Control Guidelines Steering Committee
 Ontario SARS Scientific Advisory Committee, Executive Team Member

Certifications
 1999: American College of Preventive Medicine, Board Certification, Preventative Medicine
 2001: Royal College of Physicians and Surgeons of Canada, Fellow, Public Health and Preventive Medicine

Selected works and publications

Selected works

Selected publications

References

External links

 Bonnie Henry at British Columbia Ministry of Health
 Bonnie Henry at UBC School of Population and Public Health
 

Living people
Canadian public health doctors
Canadian health officials
Canadian women physicians
Academic staff of the University of British Columbia
Dalhousie University alumni
Mount Allison University alumni
University of California, San Diego alumni
San Diego State University alumni
University of Toronto alumni
People from Charlottetown
People from Fredericton
Members of the Order of British Columbia
1960s births
21st-century Canadian physicians
Year of birth missing (living people)
Women public health doctors